A list of films produced in France in 1985.

Notes

External links
 1985 in France
 1985 in French television
 French films of 1985 at the Internet Movie Database
French films of 1985 at Cinema-francais.fr

1985
Films
Lists of 1985 films by country or language